The International Institute of Physics (IIP) is a research unit of UFRN, located in Natal, Rio Grande do Norte, Brazil with a strong international outlook permanently focused on frontier areas of theoretical physics.  In addition to its research activities, the IIP promotes regular workshops, schools, conferences, as well as public lectures. Candidates to IIP openings are selected by international experts, under an open competition regime.

References

External links
 

Physics institutes
Research institutes in Brazil
Rio Grande do Norte